Liber Vagatorum, also known as The Book of Vagabonds and Beggars with a Vocabulary of Their Language, is an anonymously written book first printed circa 1509–1510 in Pforzheim. Its Latinised title aside, the book was entirely written in German, thereby aimed at the layperson than an academic readership. Soon after the initial print, it became a bestseller that was reprinted many times over under a variety of titles throughout the sixteenth century and thereafter. Martin Luther, the seminal figure in the Protestant Reformation, edited a few of its editions beginning from 1528 and wrote an admonitory preface for them, which was in part a polemic against the Jews, wandering beggars, and their likes, and warned Christians not to give them alms as it was, in his opinion, to forsake the truly poor.

The book itself did not mention the Jews, but featured a catalogue of character types of beggars and their alleged techniques of deceit, and a list of more than 250 words in a cant called Rotwelsch.

Contents 
Liber Vagatorum is organised in three parts. The first part comprises twenty-eight chapters that describe the "secrets" of various types of beggars; one of them is Dützbetterin who claimed to have given birth to a toad, a story first documented in 1509. The second part instructs how to avoid their traps and trickery. The third part is a glossary of Rotwelsch words.

Most of the earliest editions are adorned on the title page with a woodcut of a beggar leading his wife and child on their journey on foot.

Authorship and history 
According to German philologist Friedrich Kluge, Liber Vagatorum relied on Basler Rathsmandat wider die Gilen und Lamen, which had a short list of Rotwelsch words and was published around 1450. Since the three parts of Liber Vagatorum were hardly coordinated—for example, its glossary in the third part did not list some of the Rotwelsch words used in the first—Kluge concluded that one author had combined three different sources. John Camden Hotten, who translated Liber Vagatorum into English in 1860, wrote that Liber Vagatorum had been compiled from 's reports of trials in Basel, Switzerland, in 1475, when "a great number of vagabonds, strollers, blind men, and mendicants of all orders were arrested and examined". These trials were also recorded in Hieronymus Wilhelm Ebner von Eschenbach's Heumanni Exercitationes iuris universi, vol. I. (1749), "XIII. Observatio de lingua occulta"; Knebel's and Ebner's accounts differ only in style and dialect. A well-known hypothesis is that , who was the Spitalmeister (hospital supervisor) of Pforzheim, is the author of Liber Vagatorum but this theory remains contested.
 
Its Latinised title aside, Liber Vagatorum was entirely written in German, thereby aimed at the layperson than an academic readership. The four initial editions of the book were published circa 1509–1510, the first of which was printed in Pforzheim and in High German. The book was met with immediate popularity, getting at least fourteen more editions printed the next year. Some of them were in Low German or Low Rhenish, and one had its glossary section expanded to list 280 words. 

About twenty more editions were published thereafter in the sixteenth century and some of them had altogether different titles. Beginning from 1528, a few editions titled  were edited by Martin Luther who rewrote some of their passages and authored an admonitory preface for them. Those who saw only the 1528 or a later edition with his preface sometimes mistakenly ascribed the book's authorship to him. Luther, in his preface, lamented that he had suffered at the hands of wandering beggars and their likes, whose alleged deceit he claimed was a sign of the devil's mighty rule over the world. He warned Christians not to give them alms as it was, in his view, to forsake the truly poor, and declared that the Jews had contributed Hebrew words as a main basis of Rotwelsch. Hotten partially agreed to this linguistic opinion, saying "the Hebrew appears to be a principal element. Occasionally a term from a neighbouring country, or from a dead language may be observed." English historian Clifford Edmund Bosworth surmised the Hebrew words entered Rotwelsch via Yiddish.

From around 1540, some editions were titled, rather inaccurately, Die Rotwelsch Grammatic. Around six more editions were printed in the seventeenth century and at least two others in the eighteenth.

See also

Notes 

a.  The title of the first English translation by John Camden Hotten (1860)

b. These clues narrow the date of the first edition.

References

Citations

Works cited 

 

 

  Retrieved November 2, 2022 at Project Gutenberg.  This article incorporates text from the source, which is in the public domain.

 

 

 

16th-century books
German-language books
Homeless people
Reformation in Germany
Works by Martin Luther
Works published anonymously